George Washington Johnson (1839, Binbrook, Ontario - 1917, Pasadena, California) was a Canadian schoolteacher and poet best known for writing the song “When You and I Were Young, Maggie,” dedicated to his first wife Maggie Clark.

References

Canadian schoolteachers
Hamilton, Ontario